Bibudhendra Mishra also spelt Misra  (30 December 1928 - 15 February 2012) was an Indian politician. He was elected to the Lok Sabha, the lower house of the Parliament of India from Puri, Odisha  and was member of the Rajya Sabha, the upper house of the Parliament of India representing Odisha as a member of the Indian National Congress.

References

External links
  Official biographical sketch in Parliament of India website
 "RAJYA SABHA MEMBERS BIOGRAPHICAL SKETCHES 1952 - 2003"

1920 births
Lok Sabha members from Odisha
India MPs 1962–1967
Rajya Sabha members from Odisha
2012 deaths
Indian National Congress politicians from Odisha